Top of the Old Road is the début album by Scottish country and folk band Brothers Reid. Produced by Paul Emerson, it was released on 15 August 2011 through Fat Hippy Records. The album was released to positive reviews, having been highly anticipated after the band released their critically acclaimed first single "Do It Yourself".

Release and promotion
To promote the album the band performed at the Lemon Tree, Aberdeen three days before the album's release date. The album was released on 15 August 2011 on CD and digital download formats.

Track listing

Critical reception
Top of the Old Road received positive reviews. Allan Wilkinson of Northern Sky described each song as having a "distinctively memorable hook". At Get Ready to ROCK!, Pete Feenstra called the album a "work of real beauty" and summarised it by saying: "sparkle, drive, energy, feel and three part harmonies that bring an unexpected touch of class to 9 tracks of real substance". Folking.com stated the songs have a "youthful energy ... but also show great maturity in both the playing and the song writing." Paul Kerr had a generally positive review, summarising the album as a "promising" one and selecting highlights from it.

Personnel

Brothers Reid
 Michael Reid - lead vocals, acoustic guitar, electric guitar, slide guitar
 Christopher Reid - acoustic guitar, twelve-string guitar, backing vocals
 Grant Anderson - bass guitar, cello, whistle
 Rory Comerford - fiddle, moothy, mandolin, electric guitar, keyboards, backing vocals
 Alan Hastie - drums, percussion

Additional
 Paul Emerson - keyboards on track 9

Technical
Production, mixing, engineering, mastering - Paul Emerson

References

External links
 Top of the Old Road at Fat Hippy Records website

2011 debut albums
Folk albums by Scottish artists